Agrilaxia is a genus of beetles in the family Buprestidae, containing the following species:

 Agrilaxia acuminata (Cobos, 1972)
 Agrilaxia aeruginosa (Kerremans, 1897)
 Agrilaxia alterna (Kerremans, 1900)
 Agrilaxia alticola Bílý & Westcott, 2005
 Agrilaxia alvarengai (Cobos, 1975)
 Agrilaxia ambigua (Cobos, 1972)
 Agrilaxia analis (Bílý, 1985)
 Agrilaxia angustifrons (Cobos, 1972)
 Agrilaxia bahiana (Cobos, 1972)
 Agrilaxia balloui (Fisher, 1942)
 Agrilaxia bilyana (Cobos, 1986)
 Agrilaxia bivittata (Gory, 1841)
 Agrilaxia boliviana (Cobos, 1972)
 Agrilaxia bongrandi (Cobos, 1972)
 Agrilaxia brasiliensis (Kerremans, 1900)
 Agrilaxia brunneipennis (Kerremans, 1900)
 Agrilaxia buckiana (Cobos, 1972)
 Agrilaxia catharinae (Cobos, 1972)
 Agrilaxia chlorana Obenberger, 1928
 Agrilaxia chrysifrons (Kerremans, 1896)
 Agrilaxia clara (Kerremans, 1899)
 Agrilaxia claudei (Cobos, 1972)
 Agrilaxia cordigera Obenberger, 1924
 Agrilaxia coriacea (Kerremans, 1887)
 Agrilaxia costaricensis Obenberger, 1922
 Agrilaxia costulifera (Cobos, 1972)
 Agrilaxia costulipennis (Cobos, 1972)
 Agrilaxia cyaneoviridis (Kerremans, 1900)
 Agrilaxia decipiens (Burmeister, 1872)
 Agrilaxia decolorata (Kerremans, 1899)
 Agrilaxia descarpentriesana (Cobos, 1972)
 Agrilaxia dohrni Obenberger, 1924
 Agrilaxia elongata (Kerremans, 1899)
 Agrilaxia fasciata (Waterhouse, 1889)
 Agrilaxia flavimana (Gory, 1841)
 Agrilaxia freyella Bílý, 1995
 Agrilaxia funebris (Kerremans, 1900)
 Agrilaxia gounellei Kerremans, 1903
 Agrilaxia hayeki (Cobos, 1972)
 Agrilaxia hespenheidei (Bílý, 1984)
 Agrilaxia hoschecki (Cobos, 1972)
 Agrilaxia hypocrita (Cobos, 1975)
 Agrilaxia ignifrons (Cobos, 1972)
 Agrilaxia insidiosa (Cobos, 1975)
 Agrilaxia interposita (Cobos, 1972)
 Agrilaxia jaliscoana (Bílý, 1993)
 Agrilaxia kerremansi Théry, 1911
 Agrilaxia krombeini (Cobos, 1972)
 Agrilaxia lata Kerremans, 1903
 Agrilaxia martinezi (Cobos, 1972)
 Agrilaxia meridionalis (Kerremans, 1897)
 Agrilaxia michoacana (Bílý, 1993)
 Agrilaxia minuta (Kerremans, 1900)
 Agrilaxia modesta (Kerremans, 1897)
 Agrilaxia monrosi (Cobos, 1972)
 Agrilaxia nana (Dugès, 1891)
 Agrilaxia nobilis Obenberger, 1922
 Agrilaxia occidentalis (Kerremans, 1900)
 Agrilaxia ocularis (Kerremans, 1900)
 Agrilaxia oculata (Cobos, 1972)
 Agrilaxia oculatissima (Cobos, 1972)
 Agrilaxia opima (Kerremans, 1897)
 Agrilaxia panamensis (Cobos, 1972)
 Agrilaxia paradisea (Cobos, 1972)
 Agrilaxia peruviana (Cobos, 1972)
 Agrilaxia plagiata (Kerremans, 1897)
 Agrilaxia pujoli (Cobos, 1975)
 Agrilaxia quadrivittata (Cobos, 1972)
 Agrilaxia rugosa Kerremans, 1903
 Agrilaxia schmidti Obenberger, 1924
 Agrilaxia semirugosa (Cobos, 1975)
 Agrilaxia semistriata Théry, 1911
 Agrilaxia simillima (Cobos, 1972)
 Agrilaxia smaragdina (Cobos, 1972)
 Agrilaxia solarii Théry, 1911
 Agrilaxia splendidicollis (Kerremans, 1900)
 Agrilaxia subcostata (Cobos, 1972)
 Agrilaxia subviridis (Kerremans, 1900)
 Agrilaxia suturalis Kerremans, 1903
 Agrilaxia tenebrosa (Cobos, 1972)
 Agrilaxia thoracica (Kerremans, 1899)
 Agrilaxia tremolerasi Obenberger, 1928
 Agrilaxia tristis (Cobos, 1972)
 Agrilaxia varians (Gory, 1841)
 Agrilaxia violaceipennis (Thomson, 1879)
 Agrilaxia viridisuturalis (Cobos, 1972)
 Agrilaxia vitticollis (Gory, 1841)

References

Buprestidae genera